"Small Town" is a 1985 song written by John Mellencamp and released on his 1985 album Scarecrow.  The song reached #6 on the U.S. Billboard Hot 100 chart and #13 Adult Contemporary.

Content
Mellencamp wrote the song about his experiences growing up in a small town in Indiana, having been born in Seymour, Indiana, and living in Bloomington, Indiana, which, at the time of the release of the song, was larger. The music video has references to both towns.

Backstory
"I wrote that song in the laundry room of my old house," Mellencamp told American Songwriter magazine in 2004. "We had company, and I had to go write the song. And the people upstairs could hear me writing and they were all laughing when I came up. They said, 'You've got to be kidding.' What else can you say about it?" Mellencamp later told The Wall Street Journal that he had written the lyrics using an electronic typewriter that beeped whenever he misspelled a word, which had amused the people listening upstairs; however, they were silenced when he played the song to them. In 2013, Mellencamp told Rolling Stone, "I wanted to write a song that said, 'You don't have to live in New York or Los Angeles to live a full life or enjoy your life.' I was never one of those guys that grew up and thought, 'I need to get out of here.' It never dawned on me. I just valued having a family and staying close to friends."

Reception
Cash Box called it "a rocking homage to the small town of the artist’s life and the small towns of America," saying that it is "infectious, meaningful and especially topical."

Charts

Weekly charts

Year-end charts

In popular culture
In February 2020, the Michael Bloomberg 2020 presidential campaign released a campaign advertisement pitched at small American towns with declining economies, backed by Mellencamp singing "Small Town".

References

1985 singles
1985 songs
John Mellencamp songs
Riva Records singles
Songs about the United States
Songs written by John Mellencamp
Song recordings produced by Don Gehman